Minuscule 634 (in the Gregory-Aland numbering), α 462 (von Soden), is a Greek minuscule manuscript of the New Testament, on parchment. It is dated by a colophon to the year 1394. The manuscript is lacunose. Formerly it was labeled by 169a and 206p.

Description 

The codex contains the text of the Acts of the Apostles, Catholic epistles, Pauline epistles, on 248 parchment leaves (size ), with lacunae (Acts 1:1-7:23). Written in one column per page, 21 lines per page.

The order of books: Acts of the Apostles, Catholic epistles, and Pauline epistles. Epistle to the Hebrews is placed after Epistle to Philemon.

Text 

The Greek text of the codex is a representative of the Byzantine text-type. Kurt Aland placed it in Category V.

History 

The manuscript is dated by a colophon to the year 1394. It was written by Joasaph, in Constantinople, in the monastery . Synaxarion and Menologion were written by Joannes.

The manuscript was added to the list of New Testament manuscripts by Johann Martin Augustin Scholz, who slightly examined the manuscript.

Formerly it was labeled by 169a and 206p. In 1908 Gregory gave the number 634 to it.

The manuscript currently is housed at the Vatican Library (Chis. R V 29 (gr. 23)), at Rome.

See also 

 List of New Testament minuscules
 Biblical manuscript
 Textual criticism

References

Further reading 

 R. Barbour, Greek Literary Hands A.D. 400-1600, Oxford Palaeographical Handbook (Oxford, 1981), p. 59.

Greek New Testament minuscules
14th-century biblical manuscripts